Ramshir County is in Khuzestan province, Iran. The capital of the county is Ramshir. At the 2006 census, the county's population was 49,238 in 9,296 households. The following census in 2011 counted 48,943 people in 11,390 households. At the 2016 census, the county's population was 54,004 in 14,113 households.

Administrative divisions

The population history of Ramshir County's administrative divisions over three consecutive censuses is shown in the following table. The latest census shows two districts, four rural districts, and two cities.

References

 

Counties of Khuzestan Province